Detlef Nebbe (also Detleff; 20 June 1912 – 17 April 1972) was an SS-Hauptscharführer and member of staff at Auschwitz concentration camp. He was prosecuted at the Auschwitz Trial.

Born in Husum, German Empire in June 1912, Nebbe completed 7 years of primary school, becoming a salesman by trade. He joined the SS in 1933 and the Nazi Party in 1937. On 15 September 1939 he was drafted into the Waffen-SS. On 15 October 1940 he was assigned to Auschwitz, where he remained until April 1944.
In February 1941 he served as a sergeant in the guard company. An intimidating figure among SS men in his company, he was renowned as a devout Nazi, and would abuse prisoners by beating them defiantly. He also demonstrated to his colleagues how to behave towards prisoners. For his service, he was awarded the War Merit Cross Second Class with Swords.

Nebbe was tried by the Supreme National Tribunal at the Auschwitz Trial in Kraków for his role at the camp, and was sentenced to life imprisonment for his crimes. Due to an amnesty, he was released from prison on 23 October 1956.

Bibliography 
 Cyprian T., Sawicki J., Siedem wyroków Najwyższego Trybunału Narodowego, Poznań 1962

References 

1912 births
1972 deaths
Auschwitz concentration camp personnel
German prisoners sentenced to life imprisonment
People convicted in the Auschwitz trial
People from Husum
SS non-commissioned officers

German people convicted of crimes against humanity